Miguel Ángel Hernández Ortiz (born July 19, 1984), is a Chilean footballer, and currently plays for Santiago Morning in the Primera División Chilena.

External links
 Miguel Hernández Ortíz at Football Lineups

1984 births
Living people
Chilean footballers
Chilean Primera División players
Universidad de Concepción footballers
Universidad de Chile footballers
Santiago Morning footballers
Association football forwards
Association football midfielders